The food vs. feed competition is the competition for resources, such as land, between growing crops for human consumption and growing crops for animals.

The term food vs. feed competition is also used in the livestock industry to compare crop inputs (including space required) vs. protein outputs.  For example, crops for people to eat require less land and other resources than crops for animals to eat so people can eat them.

In a circular agriculture system, wasted food (no longer edible by humans) can be provided to livestock, which in turn feed humans.

See also
 Environmental impact of meat production
 Agricultural productivity
 Environmental vegetarianism
 Precision fermentation
 Economics of veganism
 Feed conversion ratio
 Fish meal
 Food security
 Food race
 Food vs. fuel
 Meat alternative

References

 

Food and the environment